is a former Japanese football player.

Club career
Abe was born in Machida on October 5, 1984. When he was a high school student, he joined Yokohama F. Marinos in 2002. However he could hardly play in the match, he moved to J2 League club Montedio Yamagata in 2005. Although he played many matches in 2005, his opportunity to play decreased in 2006. In 2007, he moved to Regional Leagues club Ferverosa Ishikawa Hakusan FC. In July 2007, he moved to J2 League club Tokushima Vortis. In 2009, he moved to Japan Football League club Gainare Tottori. He played as regular player and the club was promoted to J2 League end of 2010 season. He retired end of 2011 season.

National team career
In September 2001, Abe was selected Japan U-17 national team for 2001 U-17 World Championship. He played 2 matches and scored a goal against United States in first match. In November 2003, he was also selected Japan U-20 national team for 2003 World Youth Championship. He played 4 matches.

Club statistics

Honors 
2000 AFC U-17 Championship Top Scorer

References

External links

1984 births
Living people
Association football people from Tokyo
Japanese footballers
Japan youth international footballers
J1 League players
J2 League players
Japan Football League players
Yokohama F. Marinos players
Montedio Yamagata players
Tokushima Vortis players
Gainare Tottori players
Association football forwards